Albert James Prince (1895 – unknown) was an English footballer who played as a forward. Born in Smallthorne, Staffordshire, he played for Manchester United and Stafford Rangers.

Personal life
Prince served as a bombardier in the Royal Garrison Artillery during the First World War.

References

External links
MUFCInfo.com profile

1895 births
English footballers
Manchester United F.C. players
Stafford Rangers F.C. players
Year of death missing
Association football forwards
People from Smallthorne
Footballers from Staffordshire
British Army personnel of World War I
Royal Garrison Artillery soldiers
Military personnel from Staffordshire